Hagaw, also known as Asocjacja Hagaw, is a Polish traditional jazz band, formed as a quintet at the Klub Stodoła in Warsaw in 1964 by Andrzej Jastrzębski, and named from the initials of the first names of its founding members. The original lineup consisted of Jastrzębski, Grzegorz Brudko, Henryk Kowalski, Wiesław Papliński and Andrzej Bielecki. The lineup has since changed many times.

Discography
 1967 - Do you love Hagaw?
 1970 - Asocjacja Hagaw i Andrzej Rosiewicz
 1971 - Assoziation Hagaw "with Goldies But Goodies"
 1974 - Assoziation Hagaw "Ich hab' das Fraeulein Helen Baden sehen"
 1975 - Asocjacja Hagaw & Andrzej Rosiewicz
 1976 - Hagaw "Veronika, der Lenz ist da"
 1977 - Asocjacja Hagaw Andrzej Rosiewicz Ewa Olszewska
 1979 - Hagaw
 1980 - Manhattan
 1980 - A.Rosiewicz i Hagaw "Ufo/Zniwo"
 1986 - Please
 2006 - Association Hagaw in Koncert /Berlin 2006

References

Polish jazz ensembles